WEDG-TV  (originally EdgeTV, later UPN4, no relation to the radio station of the same calls in Buffalo or WEDG.TV) was a cable-only UPN affiliate in New York's Capital District which was a joint venture between Time Warner Cable and Fox affiliate WXXA-TV.

Edge TV, named for and promoted with WQBK-FM and WQBJ (which at the time were branded as "The Edge" and were owned by Clear Channel Communications as sister stations to WXXA-TV), signed on at the start of 2000, displacing Boston's WSBK-TV from Time Warner's systems (and later that year, WWOR-TV from Mid-Hudson Cable systems as well as WVBG-LP on Taconic Cable, later Charter, in Nassau–Chatham, New York) and stripping low-power UPN affiliate WVBG-LP of their affiliation. Outside of UPN programming, the lineup was filled with double runs and failed syndicated programming from WXXA, older films, and an assortment of sporting events including New York Yankees games (from WNYW, then WCBS-TV) and Boston Bruins games from WSBK.

In Fall 2000, EdgeTV became UPN4 after the "Edge" radio stations were divested as a result of the merger between co-partner Clear Channel Communications and AMFM, Inc. First run programming exclusive to the station began to be added to UPN4, but the Time Warner-WXXA partnership hamstrung other providers (including satellite providers DirecTV and Dish Network and former Adelphia systems in and around Glens Falls and Pittsfield, Massachusetts) from what was seen as a secondary promotional vehicle for Time Warner services, and refused to carry it, or did add it but were slow to do so, did not advertise the addition, or put it in a channel tier away from the main broadcast tier.

The 2003 announcement of new sign-on WNYA obtaining the UPN affiliation marked the quick end of UPN4's existence. The station came to the air well before digital subchannels came to prominence and although there was consideration of continuing UPN4 as an independent station, both entities decided to end broadcasting UPN4 at midnight on September 1, 2003. Six hours later, WNYA launched over UPN4's former slots (including Time Warner channel 4), and WXXA retained UPN4's former programming inventory.

Defunct local cable stations in the United States
Television channels and stations established in 2000
Television channels and stations disestablished in 2003

2000 establishments in New York (state) 
2003 disestablishments in New York (state) 
EDG-TV